Poebrodon is an extinct genus of terrestrial herbivore in the family Camelidae, endemic to North America during the Lutetian (early Middle) Eocene 46.2—42.0 mya, existing for approximately .

Taxonomy
Poebrodon was named by Gazin (1955). Its type is Poebrodon kayi. It was assigned to Camelidae by Gazin (1955) and Carroll (1988).

Fossil distribution
Fossil distribution ranged from Utah, Wyoming, and Southern California.

References

Prehistoric camelids
Eocene even-toed ungulates
Cenozoic mammals of North America
Prehistoric even-toed ungulate genera